Marion Bartoli and Anna-Lena Grönefeld were the defending champions, but none competed this year as both were in Paris at the same week.

Li Ting and Sun Tiantian won the title by defeating Yan Zi and Zheng Jie 3–6, 6–1, 7–6(7–5) in the final.

Seeds

Draw

Draw

References
 Main and Qualifying Draws

Doubles
Pattaya Women's Open - Doubles
 in women's tennis